Thomas Carr Howe Community High School was a secondary school in Indianapolis that served grades 7–12. It was operated by Charter Schools USA. IPS Indianapolis Public Schools has plans to reopen Howe as a middle school in the 2024-25 school year.

History
Thomas Carr Howe High School (Indianapolis public school #420) broke ground in 1937. It was originally known as Irvington High School and was meant to serve the Irvington and surrounding areas on the eastside of Indianapolis. The first classes were in 1938. The school closed down in 1995. Howe reopened in 2000 as a community high school serving grades 6-12 school. Howe was eventually re-closed again in 2020. IPS has plans to reopen Howe as an IB International Baccalaureate middle school in the 2024-25 school year.

See also
 List of high schools in Indiana
 Indianapolis Public School Conference

References

Public high schools in Indiana
Public middle schools in Indiana
Schools in Indianapolis
1937 establishments in Indiana
Educational institutions established in 1937